Elections to the French National Assembly were held in French Somaliland on 10 November 1946 as part of the wider French parliamentary elections. Jean-Carles Martine was elected as the territory's MP, defeating the incumbent René Bernard-Cothier.

Results

References

French Somaliland
1946 in French Somaliland
Elections in Djibouti
November 1946 events in Africa